The Tightrope Dancer is an 1899 pastel painting by Henri de Toulouse-Lautrec, now in the Nationalmuseum in Stockholm.

References 
Nationalmuseums website

1899 paintings
Paintings by Henri de Toulouse-Lautrec
Paintings in the collection of the Nationalmuseum Stockholm
Tightrope walking
Dance in art